Gilmar Lobato da Rocha (born 17 October 1973 in Natal, Rio Grande do Norte), known simply as Gilmar, is a Brazilian retired footballer who played as a central midfielder. He also held Portuguese citizenship, due to the many years spent in the country (14 seasons in representation of four teams).

In Portugal's Primeira Liga, Gilmar amassed totals of 142 games and five goals, with Varzim SC (two seasons) and Associação Naval 1º de Maio (five, even though he did not appear in his last one).

External links

1973 births
Living people
People from Natal, Rio Grande do Norte
Brazilian footballers
Association football midfielders
Primeira Liga players
Liga Portugal 2 players
Segunda Divisão players
SC Vianense players
S.C. Espinho players
Varzim S.C. players
Associação Naval 1º de Maio players
Brazilian expatriate footballers
Expatriate footballers in Portugal
Brazilian expatriate sportspeople in Portugal
Sportspeople from Rio Grande do Norte